Hydrogen is the chemical element with symbol H and atomic number 1.

Hydrogen may also refer to:
 Hydrogen atom, about the physics of atomic hydrogen
 Hydrogen ion
 Hydron (chemistry), a.k.a. "proton" or "hydrogen"
 Isotopes of hydrogen
 Hydrogen-2 (deuterium)
 Hydrogen-3 (tritium)
 Hydrogen-4
 Hydrogen-5

Other things named "hydrogen"
 Hydrogen (horse), a champion Australian Thoroughbred racehorse
 Hydrogen (software), drum machine software

See also

 H (disambiguation)
 Hydrogen economy
 Hydrogen vehicle